Calvin Petersen (born 25 December 1961) is a retired South African football (soccer) striker who last played for Moroka Swallows.

References

1961 births
Living people
Association football forwards
South African soccer players
South African expatriate soccer players
South Africa international soccer players
Expatriate footballers in Austria
SC Eisenstadt players
Maritzburg United F.C. players
Moroka Swallows F.C. players
Durban Bush Bucks players